The Polikarpov PM-1 was a passenger aircraft created by Polikarpov in the 1920s.

Design and development
The PM-1 (PM - Passazhirskii Maybach – passenger transport Maybach engine) was a wooden biplane with a monocoque fuselage built up from glued ply veneer sheets (known as Sphon), including the integral tail-fin. The two-spar wings were skinned in plywood forward of the main spars and covered in fabric aft of the main-spars. All control surfaces were built in a similar fashion with ply-skinned structural members and built-up wooden structure covered in fabric. Large I-type inter-plane struts, canted at about 30°, and steel cables braced the wings, which were attached to the fuselage at the top and bottom of the main fuselage frames. The undercarriage consisted of 2 main-wheels on a live axle supported by V-stuts with bungee springing. The Maybach Mb.IVa engine was mounted conventionally in the nose and had a retractable radiator forward of the undercarriage.

Operational history
First flown on 10 June 1925 the PM-1 flew a public demonstration flight on 26 July 1925 and started a scheduled Moscow to Berlin service in August 1925. On one of the early flights the aircraft crashed due to engine failure, or engine bearer failure, and was not repaired as the Maybach engine was considered obsolete and the new Kalinin monoplanes promised better performance.

Specifications

References

1920s Soviet and Russian civil aircraft
PM-1
Single-engined tractor aircraft
High-wing aircraft
Aircraft first flown in 1925